The 1974 Minor States Carnival, known more formally as the 1974 ANFC Division 2 Championship was an edition of the lower division of Australian National Football Carnival, an Australian rules football interstate competition. The competition was won by Queensland.

Results

References

Australian rules interstate football
1974 in Australian rules football